Veer Narayan Singh (1795–1857) was a landlord from Sonakhan, Chhattisgarh. He spearheaded the 1857 war of Indian independence in Chhattisgarh. He was hanged at Jaistambh Chowk of Raipur, Chhattisgarh.

He is also known and considered as "The 1st Chhattisgarhi freedom fighter". His ancestor were from Gond tribal group and were residing in Bhangad. Later on, they changed their affiliation from Gond tribe and moved to Sonakhan in Raipur district. His great grandfather was Deewan of Sonakhan and at the age of thirty five he took over the landlordship rights from his father Ram Rai. He was thirty-five years old when he became the landlord of Sonakhan, Youngest landlord in the region.

The British arrested him in 1856 for looting a trader's grain stocks and distributing it amongst the poor in a severe famine year. In 1856 with the help of the soldiers of the British Army at Raipur, Veer Narayan Singh escaped from prison. He reached Sonakhan and formed an army of 500 men. Under the leadership of Smith, a powerful British army was dispatched to crush the Sonakhan army. Veer Narayan Singh's martyrdom has been resurrected in the 1990s and he has become a potent symbol of Chhattisgarhi pride. He was executed on 10 December 1857 at Jaistambh Chowk of Raipur, Chhattisgarh. He became the first martyr from Chhattisgarh in the War of Independence. Government of Chhattisgarh named a cricket stadium Shaheed Veer Narayan Singh International Cricket Stadium after him.

Buildings named after him

 

3.School on His name 

      
MONUMENT
 Shahid Veer Narayan Singh Smarak near Rajbhavan inaugurated by His Highness Giani Zail Singh (President, Republic of India) on 18 February 1984. This square is known as Shahid Veer narayan singh Chowk.

References 

8.  Story of Saheed Veer Narayan Singh thebetterchhattisgarh.com

Revolutionaries of the Indian Rebellion of 1857
1857 deaths
Indian independence activists from Madhya Pradesh
People from Bilaspur district, Chhattisgarh
1795 births
Indian landlords